John Ross Sanchez Gamboa (born November 28, 1984), known professionally as Joross Gamboa, is a Filipino actor and model who was a 2nd runner-up in the 1st season of Star Circle Quest.

Career
After four years of being with ABS-CBN Star Magic, Joross Gamboa is asked to be released and signed a two-year contract under the management of Becky Aguila. He was seen in the comedy segment Kaya Mo Ba To? in 2005 followed by Maynila in 2007 of the GMA Network, which became the reason for rumors of Joross Gamboa moving to the said Network. After signing a contract with Becky Aguila, he will stay with ABS-CBN as his new talent manager still has issues with GMA Network.

Ending the contract of Joross Gamboa with Becky Aguila, he is now under the management of Noel Ferrer since late 2009. Noel Ferrer also manages other famous actors like Bayani Agbayani and Ryan Agoncillo who are both with TV5. Currently a freelance artist, since he left his former kapamilya network ABS-CBN, he is now open working with all networks.

Right after doing a movie with Star Cinema last October 2010 My Amnesia Girl, Joross Gamboa was back December 2010, on ABS-CBN as the Antagonist in the Kristine Series: The Second Book in December playing antagonist to Bangs Garcia's character and Zanjoe Marudo's character Bernard in the Hit Primetime Television Drama.

After doing shows for ABS-CBN and TV5, and after winning best supporting actor for Intoy Syokoy ng Kalye Marino in Cinemalaya last year, he is now back doing movies with Star Cinema.

In 2016, Gamboa transferred from ABS-CBN to its rival network GMA Network. In 2017, he is now a freelance artist and he appeared as a supporting cast in ABS-CBN's La Luna Sangre and guest role in FPJ's Ang Probinsyano.

Filmography

Television
{| class="wikitable"
! Year !! Title !! Role !! Network
|-
| rowspan="2" | 2023 || The Missing Husband || TBA || rowspan="2" | 
|

Movies

Awards and nominations

References

External links

1984 births
Living people
21st-century Filipino male actors
Filipino male child actors
Filipino male television actors
Bicolano actors
Bicolano people
Star Magic
ABS-CBN personalities
GMA Network personalities
People from Camarines Norte
People from San Juan, Metro Manila
Star Circle Quest participants
Filipino male comedians